Paper craft is a collection of crafts using paper or card as the primary artistic medium for the creation of two or three-dimensional objects. Paper and card stock lend themselves to a wide range of techniques and can be folded, curved, bent, cut, glued, molded,  stitched, or layered. Papermaking by hand is also a paper craft. 

Paper crafts are known in most societies that use paper, with certain kinds of crafts being particularly associated with specific countries or cultures. In Caribbean countries paper craft is unique to Caribbean culture which reflect the importance of native animals in life of people. 

In addition to the aesthetic value of paper crafts, various forms of paper crafts are used in the education of children.  Paper is a relatively inexpensive medium, readily available, and easier to work with than the more complicated media typically used in the creation of three-dimensional artwork, such as ceramics, wood, and metals.  It is also neater to work with than paints, dyes, and other coloring materials.  Paper crafts may also be used in therapeutic settings, providing children with a safe and uncomplicated creative outlet to express feelings.

Folded paper
The word "paper" derives from papyrus, the name of the ancient material manufactured from beaten reeds in Egypt as far back as the third millennium B.C. Indeed, the earliest known example of "paper folding" is an ancient Egyptian map, drawn on papyrus and folded into rectangular forms like a modern road map. However, it does not appear that intricate paper folding as an art form became possible until the introduction of wood-pulp based papers.

The first Japanese origami is dated from the 6th century A.D. In much of the West, the term origami is used synonymously with paper folding, though the term properly only refers to the art of paper folding in Japan. Other forms of paper folding include Chinese zhezhi (摺紙), Korean jong'i jeopgi (종이접기), and Western paper folding, such as the traditional paper boats and paper planes.

Cut paper

Papel picado, as practiced in Mexico and other places in Latin America is done using chisels to cut 50 to a hundred sheets at a time, while Chinese paper cutting uses knives or scissors for up to 8 sheets. Wycinanki and other European forms usually are done on one single sheet. In either of these traditions, paper sheets are folded prior to cutting to achieve symmetrical designs.

Paper model

A technique in which you can recreate a 3d model. The polygons of a 3d mesh are unfolded to a printable pattern. With the help of glue tabs, cutting lines, mountain fold lines and valley fold lines the pattern comes together.

Paper pulp painting

Images built using colored paper pulp are a form of paper art that started in the 20th century. Chuck Close, Lynn Sures are among contemporary artist developing this medium. Paper pulp craft is widely used in rural India for making kitchen utility baskets.

Types 
 Scrapbooking
 Cardmaking
 Paper Flowers 
 Decoupage
 Papier-mâché
 Origami
 3D Origami
 Origata
 Paper Cutting
 Quilling
 Paper Making
 Book Binding
 Paper Layering
 Paper Model
 Chinese paper folding

See also 

 Art movement
Cartonería, a traditional handcraft in Mexico, of which piñatas are one of many examples
 Creativity techniques
 Decorative arts
 Arts and crafts
 List of art media
 List of artistic media
 List of art movements
 List of most expensive paintings
 List of most expensive sculptures
 List of art techniques
 List of sculptors
 Multidimensional art

References

Paper art
Artistic techniques
Decorative arts

pt:Dobradura
th:การพับกระดาษ
zh:摺紙